Gary Husband (born 14 June 1960) is an English jazz and rock drummer, pianist, keyboard player and bandleader. He is also a composer, arranger and producer.

Husband is a member of John McLaughlin's group The 4th Dimension, he also regularly performs with Germany's Norddeutscher Rundfunk Big Band and as a solo pianist. He has been a member of many of Billy Cobham's bands, guitarist Allan Holdsworth's groups, British pop/funk band Level 42, various lineups led by Jack Bruce and two lineups of guitarist Gary Moore. As a session musician, Husband has also performed, recorded or toured with Jeff Beck, Robin Trower, Nguyên Lê, Lenny White, Randy Brecker, Soft Machine Legacy, Foley, Al Jarreau, Hessischer Rundfunk Big Band, George Martin, Quincy Jones, Andy Summers, UK, Mike Stern, Dewa Budjana, Jack DeJohnette, Tony Levin, Lincoln Goines, Jimmy Haslip and bassist/composer Antoine Fafard.

Early years and career beginnings 
Born in Leeds, West Yorkshire, England, to dancer Patricia Husband and musician Peter Husband, Gary Husband trained as a classical pianist with Dame Fanny Waterman DBE and Bryan Layton. His distinct piano style has been noted to reveal jazz fusion and classical music influences. While being an internationally respected drummer, he is essentially self-taught, though he picked up casual lessons with various professional players at a young age and later spent a lengthier term with drum teacher Geoff Myers.

Having been a professional player on drums and piano from the age of 13 he joined The Syd Lawrence Orchestra at 16 as their full-time drummer. In addition to this he picked up session or touring work with artists or acts such as Lulu and The Bachelors among many others. Husband also frequently played in his home town with visiting jazz soloists from London in pubs and music venues.

Upon a move to London at the age of 18, Husband held either the piano or drums chair in groups such as Mike Carr Trio, Barbara Thompson's Paraphernalia, Gary Boyle Trio, the Morrissey–Mullen band, Jeff Clyne's Turning Point, occasionally recording with the BBC Big Band and frequently picking up freelance work performing at Ronnie Scott's Jazz Club.

Solo career 
In 1998, Husband released his first (solo synth) album, Diary Of A Plastic Box (later to be re-released as a double CD in 2008, entitled The Complete Diary Of A Plastic Box), From 1998 to 2001 he led his piano trio (The New Gary Husband Trio) featuring bassist Mick Hutton and drummer Gene Calderazzo. The trio's CD releases From The Heart and Aspire (featuring guest appearances by Billy Cobham, vocalists Mark King (musician), Christine Tobin and Hamish Stuart), highlight the music of this group. Of his several solo piano album releases, The Things I See * Interpretations Of The Music Of Allan Holdsworth is an imaginative reworking of the guitarist's music. Years later he released A Meeting Of Spirits, presenting a further selection of similarly highly personalised works based on the music of John McLaughlin.

Gary Husband's Force Majeure, his group from 2004 to 2005, featured Mahavishnu Orchestra electric violinist Jerry Goodman, trumpeter Randy Brecker, trombonist Elliot Mason, keyboard player Jim Beard, bassist Matthew Garrison and percussionist Arto Tuncboyaciyan. In 2004 the group won funding from the Contemporary Music Network and BBC Radio 3's Jazz On 3 to tour the UK. The DVD release Gary Husband's Force Majeure - Live At The Queen Elizabeth Hall, London captured the band's London performance from their debut tour.
His next jazz quartet project, Gary Husband's Drive featured saxophonist Julian Siegel, trumpeter Richard Turner and bassist Michael Janisch. Husband released their debut album Hotwired in 2009 and the group disbanded in early 2010.

Among his next projects was Dirty & Beautiful, an album release in two volumes featuring performances from himself together with many of his friends and musical collaborators, past and present. Guitarists Allan Holdsworth, Neil Taylor (guitarist), Steve Topping, John McLaughlin, Wayne Krantz, Robin Trower, Ray Russell, Steve Hackett, Mike Stern, Alex Machacek and Jimmy Herring appear, along with bassists Jimmy Johnson, Mark King, Laurence Cottle and keyboardist Jan Hammer.

Husband produced a piano and electric guitar duet album with Alex Machacek in 2013 for Abstractlogix entitled NOW.

In July 2013, Gary Husband performed a solo piano concert at the Saint-Émilion Jazz Festival.

In May 2017, Husband took his first big band production ("Dreams In Blue") to the Norddeutscher Rundfunk Big Band. Consisting of mostly his own material Husband enlisted composer and arranger Dale Wilson to prepare and interpret the scores, while Tim Hagans was brought in to direct the band. The production featured Husband playing both piano and drums. Gary also integrated special guest (Hungarian violinist) Zoltán Lantos for the debut concert performance in Hamburg.

On May 19, 2019 Husband collaborated on piano with guitarist Mark Wingfield to make the album Mark Wingfield & Gary Husband - Tor & Vale, and on March the 3rd 2020 he combined together with Markus Reuter in Tokyo to record Gary Husband & Markus Reuter - Music Of Our Times. Both albums were released on Moonjune Records.

Husband brought about his current project The Trackers (which he leads in collaboration with Norwegian guitarist & composer Alf Terje Hana) in 2020. Their debut album  Vaudeville 8:45 was recorded in 2021 (at that point still without a resident bassist) so Husband enlisted a roster of seven special guest bassists to perform on the recording. Bassists Etienne MBappé, Guy Pratt, Jimmy Haslip, Jimmy Johnson, Øyvind Grong, Mark King (musician) and Kevin Scott all feature throughout the album.

Educational 
In 1997, Rittor Music Japan released the semi-educational video Gary Husband * Interplay & Improvisation On The Drums.
Husband is an internationally respected drum clinician and has performed over the years in this capacity alongside Ricky Lawson, Omar Hakim, Dennis Chambers, Vinnie Colaiuta, Denny Seiwell, Todd Sucherman, Paul Wertico, Terry Bozzio, Simon Phillips and Billy Cobham among many others.
He has held a masterclass at the Drummers Collective in N.Y.C., and is a patron and visiting artist at Tech Music School in London.

Husband continues to run and add to his own motivational and educational drum method course The Gary Husband Drum Videocast Series from his website.

Affiliations with others

Allan Holdsworth 
A chance meeting with the influential guitarist Allan Holdsworth and bassist Jack Bruce in 1979, (while Husband was fulfilling his last engagement with saxophonist Barbara Thompson at Ronnie Scott's Club) resulted in a casual jam session. Soon after, Holdsworth, along with Husband, formed Holdsworth & Co (later to be renamed False Alarm, and eventually Allan Holdsworth I.O.U.), and eventually found their bass player in Paul Carmichael, eventually  adding vocalist Paul Williams. The group's hugely influential I.O.U. album was recorded soon after, although not made available  until 1982 upon the band's successful launch on the American scene.
In the decades since then, Husband internationally toured and recorded with Holdsworth prolifically, through many different group personnel lineups. The regular association, with bassist Jimmy Johnson (bassist) continued until Holdsworth's passing in April 2017. The partnership with Holdsworth is regarded by Husband as perhaps the most significant of his career.

As well as drums, Husband contributed keyboard parts for some tracks on two Holdsworth albums: Secrets and Wardenclyffe Tower. For the former release Husband composed the opening composition "City Nights" which he produced and on which he plays keyboards. The drummer performing on the album is Vinnie Colaiuta.

John McLaughlin 
Gary Husband was recruited by John McLaughlin in April 2005 to play keyboards in a formation called John McLaughlin & Friends for a concert in Réunion Island. Soon after, he performed keyboards and drums on McLaughlin's Industrial Zen album.

The regularly touring and recording band John McLaughlin & The 4th Dimension was then formed with Husband featured on both his instruments, bassist Hadrien Feraud and drummer Mark Mondesir. Following the departure of Feraud, (and after a short spell with bassist Dominique Di Piazza in his place) Étienne M'Bappé joined the group and McLaughlin recorded the highly acclaimed, Grammy-nominated 2010 album To the One with the new lineup, on which Husband was also featured as principal drummer (on two tracks) as well as the keyboardist throughout.
Drummer Ranjit Barot later replaced Mark Mondesir in the drum chair (leaving Husband as the only remaining originally recruited member), and the new 2011 version of the group recorded the album Now Here This, which was released in Autumn 2012.

In 2007, Husband performed with the John McLaughlin Band (along with Matthew Garrison on bass and Vinnie Colaiuta on drums) at Eric Clapton's Crossroads Guitar Festival in Chicago.

Husband's composition "Sulley" has long been a popular inclusion in the 4th Dimension's live repertoire, and features on the group's 2009 live DVD in Belgrade.

On 7 October 2013, Husband and John McLaughlin performed at the Metropolitan Museum of Art in New York as a duet. Following the performance, the Paul Reed Smith guitar McLaughlin played was presented to the museum by its maker.

In late 2017 Abstract Logix presented an almost two month long tour in North America celebrating the music of The Mahavishnu Orchestra featuring both John McLaughlin & The 4th Dimension and the (then) group of guitarist Jimmy Herring The Invisible Whip. Each night’s finale featured both bands joining forces onstage. The resulting live album of the San Francisco show John McLaughlin & The 4th Dimension / Jimmy Herring & The Invisible Whip - Live In San Francisco was released in 2018.

The 4th Dimension group’s release Live At Ronnie Scott’s featured a new reading of the Mahavishnu Orchestra classic “Miles Beyond” for which John McLaughlin picked up a GRAMMY Award for Best Improvised Jazz Solo in 2018.

The 2021 release Liberation Time is the 9th John McLaughlin release Husband has performed on to date. The band and association are still active today.

Billy Cobham 
In 1992, Gary Husband joined legendary drummer Billy Cobham's regular touring band playing keyboards and second drum kit. Soon after, he recorded on Cobham's The Traveler album, and to date Husband is still the only additional drummer to have performed a drums duet with the former Mahavishnu Orchestra drummer on one of his own recordings. In 1995 the Billy Cobham International Quartet (featuring Husband, bassist Kai Eckhardt and guitarist Peter Wolpl) toured North America and Canada.

Other notable touring or recording periods with Cobham include the 1998 Billy Cobham (featuring Randy Brecker) Quintet, (with which Husband recorded the album Focused) and the 2002 U.S.A. "Spectrum" 30th Anniversary Tour, along with bassist Leland Sklar and guitarist Dean Brown (guitarist).
Husband also toured with Cobham's Higher Ground, North By Northwest and Culture Mix bands, recording the album Culture Mix with the latter. Husband's compositions "Le Coco", "Blue Dreams" and "Avatar" were performed by Cobham's groups during these periods.

In early 2013, Husband was recruited again as keyboardist and contributing composer for Cobham's 40th "Spectrum" Anniversary U.S. tour, along with guitarist Dean Brown, violinist Jerry Goodman and bassist Ric Fierabracci. In September and October of the same year, the group (now known as Billy Cobham Spectrum 40) returned to the U.S.A., Canada and Europe (minus Jerry Goodman) and performed further touring. Husband's pieces "If The Animals Had Guns Too" and "Dreams In Blue" were featured compositions on these tours.

The album Billy Cobham's Spectrum 40 Live was released in 2015 and consisted of recorded material from the band's 2013 international touring activity. Husband left the group in May 2015.

Jack Bruce 
In April 1992, Husband performed a benefit concert in London with Jack Bruce alongside guitarist Clem Clempson and keyboardist Ronnie Leahy, marking the beginning of a new working relationship with the ex-Cream bassist and singer. In 1993 Husband toured North America and Europe with Bruce along with guitarist Blues Saraceno and performed at the ‘Jack Bruce 50th Birthday Concerts’ in Cologne (playing drums and piano) along with Clem Clempson, Ginger Baker, Gary 'Mudbone' Cooper, Gary Moore, Pete Brown, Dick Heckstall-Smith, Bernie Worrell, Simon Phillips, Kip Hanrahan and others. The events were both filmed and released on audio CD by CMP Records.

Husband and Bruce recorded two tracks on Gary Moore's Ballads & Blues 1982–1994 album in 1994, and the three had been working as a regularly performing power trio. This line-up was the original blueprint for the group which was to become BBM (Bruce-Baker-Moore) which Husband missed due to touring commitments with Billy Cobham. Ginger Baker was recruited in his place, and since, Husband also worked regularly in a trio format with Bruce alongside guitarist Clem Clempson.

Jack Bruce / Robin Trower / Gary Husband 
In 2007, Jack Bruce again joined forces with the guitarist Robin Trower for a third recording together. Husband was enlisted for the new studio album, named Seven Moons. A new three-piece was established as a result of the group's successful chemistry and the trio toured extensively through Europe together, releasing Seven Moons Live (later released as a joint CD/DVD package, retitled as Songs from the Road).

Level 42 
Following the departure of original band members Phil Gould and Boon Gould in 1987, Husband was invited to join (as drummer) a new edition of the British chart-topping pop/funk band Level 42 and did so early in 1988 while still holding down work touring work with Allan Holdsworth (who also toured with Level 42 later in 1991 having recorded the 'Guaranteed' album with the group). Husband recorded two studio albums with the group during his tenure (Staring at the Sun and Guaranteed) and left the band in March 1992. In 2000, he rejoined Level 42 frontman and bassist Mark King briefly in his “One Man” group and then on a session basis went on to perform again on tours as part of a reformed Level 42 line-up before finally leaving a few years later following the release of the band's Retroglide album of 2006. Husband has enjoyed a longtime friendship with Mark King and has supported him on his solo projects, notably 'Mark King and Friends' in which Husband played keyboards. King reciprocated by appearing on three of Husband’s albums to date.

Other affiliations

Jazz 
Husband has played with a multitude of jazz artists throughout his career.

During his teenage years he played with saxophonist Alan Wakeman, trombonist Malcolm Griffiths and late avant-garde jazz composer Pat Evans.

In 1980, he toured and recorded a radio broadcast with a quartet led by pianist Gordon Beck and Allan Holdsworth along with bassist Jeff Clyne.

In the 1990s, (playing drums) he was a member of saxophonist Alan Skidmore's Quartet, guitarist Jim Mullen's Quartet and a number of others. Gary also played engagements with pianist Geoffrey Keezer and bassist James Genus (in support of Keezer's Turn Up The Quiet album) and toured Canada in 1998 with the pianist along with bassist Christian McBride.
In the 2000s he recorded the album Introducing with saxophonist Renato D'Aiello as pianist. On drums, he was also a member of the Julian Siegel Quartet, played live with pianist Olga Konkova's trio (along with bassist Per Mathisen) and the Randy Brecker/Bob Berg group with pianist Kevin Hays.

In 2006, he joined forces with saxophonist Christof Lauer for a trio project with tuba player Michel Godard and recorded the album Blues In Mind. Husband was drummer and pianist in the project and the band's repertoire was made up of original compositions from all three musicians.
He also worked with pianist Yaron Herman's trio, drummer Peter Erskine, drummer/composer Asaf Sirkis (contributing a composition to his trio's The Monk album, and performing as guest keyboardist) around that time.

In February 2015, Husband recorded The Goldilocks Zone album (playing drums) in Spain with Olga Konkova Trio along with bassist Per Mathisen

In 2016 played live in London on drums with guitarist Larry Coryell.

In April 2017, Gary began playing live with pianist Antonio Faraò in trio formation, along with performing guests Biréli Lagrène and Didier Lockwood. In May 2017 Husband performed live with German pianist Joachim Kühn's trio featuring bassist Chris Jennings featuring guest performer Italian trumpeter Enrico Rava

In 2019 Husband played double piano duet performances with Joachim Kühn.

Gary has played live regularly for many years with bassist Per Mathisen in Scandinavia and Europe either on keyboards or as drummer regularly with guitarists Ulf Wakenius or Nguyên Lê. In January of 2019 Husband (on drums) recorded the album Sounds Of 3 Edition 2 with the Mathisen & Wakenius trio and recorded again with the trio of Olga Konkova and Per the album Open Secret in March 2020.

In November 2022 Husband played at the Timisoara Jazz Festival in Romania on drums with Shri Sriram Quartet along with pianist Bugge Wesseltoft and saxist Tore Brunborg

Jazz fusion 
Husband deputised for drummer Simon Phillips in the group RMS along with Mo Foster and Ray Russell in 1983, and has also performed and recorded with both musicians in more recent years on their own solo albums. In 1996, Husband performed on guitarist Anthony Hindson's album It's A Curious Life, which also featured Zakir Hussain, L. Shankar and Jack Bruce among others. In 1999 Husband recorded drums with trumpeter Iwan Van Hetten for his debut album Time.

In 2006, Husband toured Europe with guitarist Mike Stern's group, and then again in 2009, in a version of the group that featured Randy Brecker and bassist Chris Minh Doky.

He has also performed and recorded on projects with keyboardist/composer Aydin Esen, bassists Jonas Hellborg, Janek Gwizdala, drummers Sebastiaan Cornelisson, Jason Smith and the Jazz Fusion/Jam band Gongzilla with bassist Hansford Rowe (musician), percussionist Benoît Moerlen and guitarist Bon Lozaga. Husband has also performed with guitarist Apostolis Anthimos's trio and with bassist Janek Gwizdala's formations on occasions.

In November 2013, Husband joined Lenny White & Friends as keyboardist for performances in London and Switzerland. The group also featured Foley (musician), Bennie Maupin and bassist Jerry Brooks.

Husband guested on Dewa Budjana's 2014 album "Surya Namaskar" on synth. More recently he recorded with the Indonesian guitarist on Budjana’s “Zentuary” album as pianist, drummer and lead synth player along with Jack DeJohnette, bassist Tony Levin and others. 

Husband performed on piano, electric piano and lead synthesiser on bassist/composer Oytun Ersan’s 2018 “Fusiolicious” album along with Dave Weckl, Eric Marienthal, Brett Garsed, Mike Miller and others.

In 2021 the album Solar Flash by drummer and composer Asaf Sirkis was released featuring Husband on keyboards, Kevin Glasgow on electric bass and others.

Rock and progressive rock 
In 1986, Husband briefly became a member of Esquire with vocalist Nikki Squire, bassist Nigel McLaren, guitarist Steve Topping, and keyboardist Charles Olins. 

In 1996 Husband toured Europe with guitarist Andy Summers to support Summers' Synaesthesia album. He also appeared around this time on keyboards with guitarist Jeff Beck.

The long friendship and musical relationship Husband has had with the guitarist Steve Topping resulted in a CD of early jams from the 1980s (entitled What It Is) also featuring bassist Paul Carmichael. Husband performed drums and keyboards on Topping's 1997 debut album Time & Distance and his 2004 album Late Flower.

In May 2012, he joined UK with Eddie Jobson, John Wetton, and Alex Machacek on their Night after Night 2012 tour, replacing Terry Bozzio on drums for their European concerts. He headlined with the group at the NEARfest Apocalypse 2012 festival in Bethlehem, Pennsylvania.

He joined guitarist Marcelo Paganini for his album 2012 Space Traffic Jam in 2013 with Eumir Deodato on keyboards, Tony Kaye on keyboards, and bassist Billy Sherwood.

In March 2015, Husband stepped in for drummer John Stanley Marshall, performing with Soft Machine Legacy for a short tour of Japan with John Etheridge, Theo Travis, Roy Babbington, and guest artist Keith Tippett. (In 2018 Husband toured again in Japan with Soft Machine only this time as featured special guest on piano & keyboards.) 

In May 2017, he recorded in Spain for guitarist Dusan Jevtovic on his album with Markus Reuter and bassist Bernat Hernández for Moonjune Records.

In late February 2020 Gary embarked upon a tour of Japan as special guest on keyboards with the group Stick Men with founder members King Crimson alumni bassist Tony Levin and drummer Pat Mastelotto with newer recruit guitarist Markus Reuter. The pandemic had (in Japan) just been announced and the group managed to fulfill only the first concert booking of the tour. Nevertheless the concert from Nagoya recorded on the 28th of February was released on Moonjune Records as Owari (featuring Gary Husband).

In 2021 Husband played keyboards with bassist Carlitos Del Puerto and drummer Simon Phillips on the track “Blue Mansion” from Dewa Budjana’s album Naurora. He also recorded drums on the album Spandrel for cellist Phil Hirschi and guitarist Spencer Smith’s group of the same name in this year.

In 2022 recorded on guitarist Jan Rivera’s Existential Paranoia album release with drummer Marco Minnemann and bassist Jimmy Johnson (bassist) along with Mohini Dey Jordan Rudess and others.

Big bands / composers and arrangers 

Gary started his career with Britain’s popular Syd Lawrence Orchestra in 1976 as drummer at 16 years of age.

Husband had the opportunity to perform with Gil Evans in the early 1980s, in both a live and recording session setting.

Since 2005, Husband has been a regular guest drummer with Hamburg's Norddeutscher Rundfunk Big Band, and through this association he has worked for composers and arrangers such as Colin Towns, Maria Schneider, Jörg Achim Keller, Steve Gray, Dieter Glawischnig, Geir Lysne, Florian Ross, Michael Gibbs, Mischa Schumann, Marko Lackner and behind featured performers such as Joe Lovano, Al Jarreau, Norma Winstone, Maria Pia de Vito and Nguyen Le.

He has also performed in projects with the HR Big Band of Frankfurt (with which he has also appeared as a featured special guest artist at the Rome Jazz Festival), with composer Helge Sunde and the Norrbotten Big Band of Sweden and for a Jack Bruce project with the Britain’s BBC Big Band.

In August 2012, Gary Husband performed at the Solidarity of Arts Festival in Gdańsk, Poland with Quincy Jones, Tomasz Stańko and the NDR Bigband.

In May 2013, Husband performed and recorded Nguyen Le's "The Dark Side Of The Moon - Tribute to Pink Floyd" project with leader Michael Gibbs, Maria Pia de Vito and the NDR Bigband.

Pop 
In 1989, Husband performed (along with members of the group Level 42 and musical director Sir George Martin) as "house band" drummer for The Prince's Trust Rock Gala, backing artists such as Mike + The Mechanics, Andy Bell (singer), Will Downing, Alexander O'Neal, John Farnham, Swing Out Sister, Mica Paris and Spandau Ballet.

Husband toured often with the guitarist Gary Moore through various band lineups from 1993 into the early 2000s, and performed on three of Moore's studio albums. He also recorded with singers such as Jimmy Nail and Brian Houston (musician), toured with singer Ron Sexsmith and recorded for drum n' bass protagonists Dillinja and Lemon D in this period.

Acknowledgements 
Gary Husband's proficiency on both drums and keyboards has received praise from other musicians and critics. In 2017, Gavin Harrison of Porcupine Tree referred to him as "a great, amazingly talented musician! ... He's off the charts talented, this guy. I don't know anyone else in the world who can play piano at that level, and drums at that level". Music critic John Fordham of The Guardian considers him one of the best British musicians in the contemporary post-bop scene, describing Husband's pianistic style as "an onrush of long-lined phrases and ambiguous harmonies boldly adapted from Herbie Hancock and Bill Evans."

In 2011, when asked to recommend modern drummers to a drumming magazine, Bill Bruford of King Crimson mentioned Gary Husband, stating that "anything Gary plays on is great" and concluding that he is among the "players [who] are helping push the boundaries of how things should be." Pat Mastelotto said that Husband is an "inspiration to every drummer." Other drummers who have cited him as an influence or expressed admiration for his drumming work are Tomas Haake of Meshuggah. Sean Reinert of Cynic, Peter Wildoer of Darkane, and Rick Colaluca of Watchtower.

Selected discography

Solo album releases 
 (1998) Diary of a Plastic Box
 (1998) Steve Topping, Gary Husband and Paul Carmichael - What It Is (Live in the studio circa 1980)
 (1999) The New Gary Husband Trio: From the Heart
 (2004) Gary Husband & Friends: Aspire
 (2004) The Things I See - Interpretations of the Music of Allan Holdsworth
 (2006) A Meeting of Spirits - Interpretations of the Music of John McLaughlin
 (2008) The Complete Diary of a Plastic Box
 (2009) Gary Husband's Drive - Hotwired
 (2009) Tryptych. Shulgin’s Songbook. Part II - Gary Husband Plays Alexander Shulgin
 (2010) Dirty & Beautiful Vol 1
 (2012) Dirty & Beautiful Vol 2
 (2013) Gary Husband and Alex Machacek: NOW
 (2013) Alexander Shulgin's Diptych Skazka. Part 2. Skazka for boys
 (2014) Dirty & Beautiful Vol 1 Remix Edition
 (2019) Mark Wingfield and Gary Husband - Tor & Vale
 (2020) Gary Husband and Markus Reuter - Music of our Times
 (2020) Gary Husband’s Drive - Live In London
 (2020) Postcards From The Past, Pt.1
 (2020) Gary Husband’s Force Majeure - Highlights From Tour In 2004
 (2020) Martin Krampl and Gary Husband - Mountains To Climb (Still)
 (2022) Gary Husband & Alf Terje Hana - The Trackers - Vaudeville 8:45

Solo singles releases 
 (2019) Greb//Husband - Benny Greb & Gary Husband collaboration

Solo DVD/video releases 
 (1997) Gary Husband - Interplay & Improvisation On The Drums - VHS VIDEO
 (2003) Gary Husband & The Mondesir Brothers - To The Power Of Three - DVD
 (2005) Gary Husband's Force Majeure - Live At The Queen Elizabeth Hall, London - DVD

Album releases with others 
 (1982) Allan Holdsworth I.O.U.
 (1985) Allan Holdsworth - Metal Fatigue
 (1986) Allan Holdsworth - Atavachron
 (1987) Allan Holdsworth - Sand
 (1988) Level 42 - Staring at the Sun
 (1989) Allan Holdsworth - Secrets
 (1989) Level 42 - Live At Wembley
 (1991) Level 42 - Guaranteed
 (1991) Chris White - Shadowdance
 (1992) Allan Holdsworth - Wardenclyffe Tower
 (1993) Jack Bruce - Cities of the Heart
 (1994) Allan Holdsworth - Hard Hat Area
 (1994) Billy Cobham - The Traveler
 (1994) Gary Moore - Ballads & Blues 1982–1994
 (1996) Jimmy Nail - Crocodile Shoes 2
 (1996) Juicy Lucy - Blue Thunder
 (1996) Gongzilla - Thrive
 (1997) Steve Topping - Time & Distance
 (1997) Gary Moore - Dark Days in Paradise
 (1997) Brian Houston - Good News Junkie
 (1997) Jack Bruce - Sitting On Top Of The World
 (1998) Billy Cobham - Focused
 (1999) Gary Moore - A Different Beat
 (1999) Iwan Van Hetten - Time
 (1999) Jimmy Nail - Tadpoles In A Jar
 (1999) Anthony Hindson & Friends - It's A Curious Life
 (1999) Mark King Group - Live at the Jazz Cafe
 (2000) Grupo Mark King - Live on the Isle Of Wight 2000 
 (2000) Lemon D - Two Techniques
 (2001) Renato D'Aiello Euro All Stars - Introducing
 (2001) Billy Cobham - Many Years BC
 (2001) Jim Mullen - Live In Glasgow
 (2001) Level 42 - Live at Reading 2001
 (2002) Billy Cobham - Culture Mix
 (2003) Level 42 - Live at the Apollo 
 (2004) Allan Holdsworth Group Live - Then!
 (2004) Steve Topping - Late Flower
 (2004) Mo Foster - Southern Reunion
 (2004) Jazz Outreach Project - Digital Directions
 (2005) Jason Smith - Think Like This
 (2006) Ray Russell - Goodbye Svengali
 (2006) Jason Smith - Tipping Point
 (2006) Level 42 - Retroglide
 (2006) John McLaughlin - Industrial Zen
 (2006) Level 42 - The Retroglide Tour 
 (2007) Christof Lauer - Blues In Mind
 (2007) Jack Bruce, Robin Trower - Seven Moons
 (2008) Asaf Sirkis Trio - The Monk
 (2009) Level 42 - Live in Holland 2009
 (2010) John McLaughlin & The 4th Dimension - To the One
 (2012) John McLaughlin & The 4th Dimension - Now Here This
 (2012) Mark King & Friends - Live in Soho, London 2012
 (2013) SelKA, Aydin Esen - Transformation
 (2013) Ray Russell - Now, More Than Ever
 (2013) Various Artists - London Standard Time
 (2013) Billy Cobham - Compass Point
 (2014) Marcelo Paganini - 2012 Space Traffic Jam
 (2014) Billy Cobham - Tales from the Skeleton Coast
 (2014) Dewa Budjana - Surya Namaskar
 (2014) John McLaughlin & The 4th Dimension - The Boston Record
 (2014) Peter Fernandes - Q.E.D.
 (2014) Nguyên Lê with Michael Gibbs & NDR Bigband - celebrating The Dark Side Of The Moon
 (2014) Antoine Fafard - Ad Perpetuum
 (2014) NDR Bigband - Tall Tales of Jasper County (The Double Doubles Suite). Music by Dale Wilson
 (2014) Janek Gwizdala - Motion Picture
 (2015) Billy Cobham - Spectrum 40 Live
 (2015) Olga Konkova Trio - The Goldilocks Zone
 (2015) John McLaughlin - Black Light
 (2016) Beledo - Dreamland Mechanism
 (2016) Dean Brown - Rolajafufu
 (2016) Antoine Fafard - Sphere
 (2016) Dewa Budjana - Zentuary
 (2016) Sebastiaan Cornelissen - Spirit vs. Origin
 (2016) Athana - Invisible Colors
 (2017) John McLaughlin & The 4th Dimension - Live At Ronnie Scott’s
 (2018) Oytun Ersan - Fusiolicious
 (2018) John McLaughlin & The 4th Dimension / Jimmy Herring & The Invisible Whip - Live In San Francisco
 (2018) Felix Behrendt, Stefan Böttcher, NDR Bigband - Cinephonie Noir
 (2019) Antoine Fafard - Borromean Odyssey
 (2019) Per Mathisen / Ulf Wakenius / Gary Husband - Sounds Of 3 (Edition 2)
 (2020) Dusan Jevtovic - If You See Me
 (2020) Quentin Collins All Star Quintet - A Day In The Life
 (2020) Markus Strothmann - Emerald
 (2020) Allan Holdsworth - Frankfurt ‘86
 (2020) Stick Men featuring Gary Husband - Owari
 (2020) Roman Miroshnichenko - The Sixth Sense
 (2021) Steve Hunt - Connections
 (2021) Dewa Budjana - Naurora
 (2021) Asaf Sirkis - Solar Flash
 (2021) John McLaughlin - Liberation Time
 (2021) Purbayan Chatterjee - Unbounded (Abaad)
 (2021) Olga Konkova Trio - Open Secret
 (2022) Pablo Held - Meet Me At The Loft (Live)
 (2022) John McLaughlin - The Montreux Years
 (2022) Spandrel (featuring Phil Hirschi, Spencer Smith & Gary Husband) - Spandrel
 (2022) Jan Rivera - Existential Paranoia
 (2022) Per Mathisen, Hans Mathisen, Petter Wettre, Gary Husband - More Secrets

DVD/video releases with others 
 (1989) Level 42 - Fait Accompli - VHS
 (1989) Level 42 - Level Best - VHS
 (1989) Various Artists - The Prince's Trust Rock Gala 1989 - VHS
 (2000) Grupo Mark King - Live on the Isle Of Wight 2000 - DVD
 (2001) Level 42 - Live At Reading Hall 2001 - DVD
 (2002) Mark King – In Concert Ohne Filter Musik Pur (Live Baden Baden 1999) - DVD
 (2004) Gary Moore & The Midnight Blues Band - Live In Montreux 1990 - DVD
 (2004) Level 42 - Live At The Apollo, London 2003 - DVD
 (2005) Gongzilla - Live In Concert & The East Village Studio - DVD
 (2006) Level 42 - Retroglide Tour 2006 - DVD
 (2007) Eric Clapton Crossroads Guitar Festival 2007 - (John McLaughlin Band, also featuring Matthew Garrison and Vinnie Colaiuta) - DVD
 (2008) Triptych - Shulgin's Songbook - DVD
 (2009) John McLaughlin & The 4th Dimension - Live @ Belgrade - DVD
 (2009) Level 42 - Live in Holland 2009 - DVD
 (2009) Jack Bruce & Robin Trower - Seven Moons Live - DVD
 (2013) Level 42 - Live at the Town and Country Club 1992 - DVD
 (2020) Allan Holdsworth - Frankfurt ‘86 - DVD
 (2022) Allan Holdsworth - Jarasum International Jazz Festival 2014 - DVD

References

External links 
 Gary Husband, official site
 Gary Husband page at Drummerworld
 Gary Husband at All About Jazz

1960 births
Living people
Musicians from Leeds
English session musicians
English rock drummers
English jazz drummers
British male drummers
The Gary Moore Band members
Alessa Records artists
British male jazz musicians
Human Chain members
Morrissey–Mullen members
RMS (band) members
Edition Records artists